Jackie Chan is a prolific singer who started producing records in the early 80s. He started singing the theme songs over the closing credits of his films in 1980, when the film The Young Master was produced. Chan sang its theme song, titled "Kung Fu Fighting Man" entirely in English. Since then he has produced over 20 different albums, singing over 100 songs in over five languages, and has teamed up with singers such as Emil Chau and the late Anita Mui. His personal achievements also include winning Best Foreign Singer Award in Japan in 1984.

Studio albums

Compilation albums

Theme songs
Chan has performed the theme songs for the following films.

Other songs
Chan has also performed on the following songs.

References

Pop music discographies
Jackie Chan
Jackie Chan